Paul Mahern (born September 11, 1963) is an American rock and pop record producer, mixing and mastering engineer, singer, songwriter, professor, and yoga teacher. Mahern has worked with acts such as John Mellencamp, Lily & Madeleine, The Fray, Iggy Pop, Lisa Germano, Willie Nelson, Okkervil River, Over the Rhine, Afghan Whigs, Reverend Peyton's Big Damn Band, Magnolia Electric Co., and Neil Young.

Life and career

Early life
Paul Cantwell Mahern was the youngest in a family of eight.  He was born in Indianapolis and lived in Chicago for much of his childhood before returning to Indianapolis as a teenager.

Soon after, Mahern burst onto the American music scene in 1979 as the 17-year-old singer for seminal hardcore punk band, The Zero Boys. The band was known nationwide for its intense live performances, but it was their debut album, "Vicious Circle," that remains a punk-rock staple to this day, recently seeing a re-release on celebrated indie label Secretly Canadian Records.

Pseudonyms
Mahern is credited and referred to interchangeably under several monikers including:
 Paul Mahern
 Paul Z
 Paul Cantwell Mahern
 Mahan Kalpa Singh
 Mahan Kalpa

Record production
During his days in The Zero Boys, Mahern was drawn to the other side of the glass and started learning about the production aspects of record-making. He began by recording bands local to the Indianapolis area, and was soon working at Hit City Recording as an in-house engineer. After a few years of paying his dues in and around Indy, Paul made a move to Bloomington, Indiana, where he started working with major label acts like Blake Babies, The Judybats and Mysteries Of Life. He founded Affirmation Records.

Mahern eventually attracted the attention of John Mellencamp, who now works primarily with Mahern as his recording engineer. Most recently they undertook a project for Mellencamp's "No Better Than This" album by touring the country with co-producer T-Bone Burnett, to record in rooms with a single 1950's reel-to-reel tape deck and one microphone.

Always open to learning more about his field, Mahern worked for two years at Indiana University on the NEH-funded Sound Directions project, at the Archives of Traditional Music. It was there that Mahern was lead engineer on an IU and Harvard University co-authored paper on best practices for audio preservation. His work there involved all aspects of transferring analog sources to the digital realm, including everything from restoration and repair of old tapes and discs to digitization and metadata management.

Mahern has produced and/or engineered many national and local Indiana artists' records, including Afghan Whigs, Blake Babies, Lisa Germano, The Fray, Over the Rhine (band), Rev. Peyton's Big Damn Band, Mercy Creek, Sloppy Seconds, Turnerjoy, Toxic Reasons, Antenna, The Judybats, The Sugarfreaks, Thin Lizard Dawn, John Mellencamp, El Nino, John Wilkes Booze, The PIeces, The Mary Janes, Iggy Pop, Farm Aid.

In 2012, Mahern began working with Lily & Madeleine, a sister duo from Indianapolis, IN. He discovered the girls and encouraged them to start writing, later recording and producing both their EP and self-titled full length, released in November 2013 on Asthmatic Kitty Records.

Industry recognition
Engineer on The Fray's 2007 Grammy Award-nominated release, How to Save a Life, which was RIAA certified double platinum.  
Engineer and/or Producer on multiple Gold and Platinum records for John Mellencamp:  "Words and Music, "Cuttin' Heads", "John Mellencamp", "The Best That I Could Do"
Engineered multiple Grammy Award-nominated recordings for John Mellencamp: "Your Life is Now", "Peaceful World", "Our Country".

Bands and musical projects

Zero Boys
In 1979, at age 17, Mahern was enlisted to be the singer and frontman for up-and-coming Indianapolis band, Zero Boys.

Their first release, Livin' in the '80s, was a 7-inch EP released by the band on their home-brew Z-Disc label. Their debut full-length album, Vicious Circle, was released in 1982 with its distinctive bright yellow cover on the local label Nimrod Records.

The Zero Boys have been cited as influential to many current punk and punk-pop bands.  Recently, The Hives released a cover of Zero Boys' "Civilization's Dying"

Dandelion Abortion (mid 1980s)
Paul Mahern, Randy Ochsenrider, Rick Ochsenrider, Mike Sheets

Datura Seeds (late 1980s - early 1990s)
Late 1980s-Early 1990s. Paul Mahern, Jonee Quest, Lee Cuthbert, Tom Downs, Vess Ruhtenberg

DNA-12 (late 1990s)
Late 1990s.  Paul Mahern, Gretchen Holtz

References

External links
"Zero Boys at The Bishop 3/10/10 + Paul Mahern Interview", Live Buzz, March 20, 2010

1963 births
Living people
Record producers from Indiana
Musicians from Indianapolis
Singers from Indiana
20th-century American male singers
20th-century American singers
21st-century American male singers
21st-century American singers